Stari Žednik (also known as Žednik) is a village located in the Subotica municipality, in the North Bačka District of Serbia. It is situated in the autonomous province of Vojvodina. The village is ethnically mixed and, according to the 2002 census, it has 2,230 inhabitants with a Croatian relative majority.

Name
In Serbian the village is known as Стари Жедник / Stari Žednik or Жедник / Žednik, in Croatian as Žednik (since 2009) or Stari Žednik (before 2009), in Hungarian as Nagyfény, and in Bunjevac as Stari Žednik or Žednik.

Ethnic groups (2002 census)
Croats = 727 (32.60%)
Hungarians = 576 (25.83%)
Bunjevci = 327 (14.66%)
Serbs = 248 (11.12%)
Yugoslavs = 139 (6.23%)
Others (Montenegrins, Albanians, Germans, Macedonians, Rusyns, Slovaks, etc.).

Historical population
1981: 2,472
1991: 2,323
2011: 1,961

Tourist attractions

The Saint Mark the Evangelist Catholic Church was built by the plans of Zsigmond Moravetz, in neogothic style and opened in 1911. Its first parish priest was Hungarian Benjamin Hegedűs, and the current one is Croat Željko Šipek, who serves the Croatian and Hungarian communities.

See also
List of places in Serbia
List of cities, towns and villages in Vojvodina

References
Slobodan Ćurčić, Broj stanovnika Vojvodine, Novi Sad, 1996.

Places in Bačka
Subotica
Bunjevci